Miss World USA 1977 was the 16th edition of the Miss World USA pageant, held in Bridgeport, Connecticut. The title was won by Cindy Darlene Miller of Virginia. She was crowned by outgoing titleholder, Kimberly Marre Foley of Michigan. Miller went on to represent the United States at the Miss World 1977 Pageant in London later that year. She finished as 4th runner-up at Miss World.

Results

Placements

Delegates
The Miss World USA 1977 delegates were:

 Alabama - Regina Parks
 Alaska - Laura Windsor
 Arizona - Linda Mauldin
 Arkansas - Sharon Kay Boyd
 California - Melissa Prophet
 Colorado - Diana V. Wright
 Connecticut - Dorothy Mendygral
 Delaware - Graceann Di Andrea
 District of Columbia - Donna Lynn Dixon
 Florida -  Janet Gail Wilson
 Georgia - Regina Renee Crawford
 Hawaii - Unknown
 Idaho - Jalynne Almond
 Illinois - Susan Barbara Matison
 Indiana - Renee Dian Roman
 Iowa - Lisa Ann Plumb
 Kansas - Diane M. Hagen
 Kentucky - Daphne Tuitele
 Louisiana - Melanie Jo Bergeron
 Maine - Jeanie Green
 Maryland - Lydia Vuynovich
 Massachusetts - Cheryl Patricia Hyttinen
 Michigan - Denise Ostrowski 
 Mississippi - Vickie Smith
 Missouri - Cindy L. Frasher
 Nebraska - Diane Renee Evers
 Nevada - Kimberly Claudette Baucum
 New Hampshire - Cindy Lee Prindiville
 New Jersey - Susan Leahy
 New Mexico - Kathleen Carrie Callahan
 New York - Kathleen Downey
 North Carolina - Betty Lou Hutchinson
 Ohio - Deborah K. Thorne
 Oklahoma - Sandy L. Schwarz
 Pennsylvania - Janice Lee O’Brien
 Rhode Island - Battistina Del Vecchio
 South Carolina - Teresia Ann Woods
 Tennessee - Anita Katherine Ray
 Texas - Denise Ann Kranich
 Utah - Sheryl L. Gunter
 Vermont - K. Michele Linderman
 Virginia - Cindy Darlene Miller
 Washington - Unknown
 West Virginia - Retha Hellms
 Wisconsin - Margaret Mary Atherton
 Wyoming - Mary Elizabeth Oliver

Notes

Did not Compete

Crossovers
Contestants who competed in other beauty pageants:

Miss USA
1976: : Donna Lynn Dixon (as )

Miss World America
1979: : Kathleen Carrie Callahan

References

External links
Miss World Official Website
Miss World America Official Website

1977 in the United States
World America
1977
1977 in Connecticut
Bridgeport, Connecticut